Radikal Bikers is a racing arcade game developed by the Spanish company Gaelco in 1998, with also a conversion for PlayStation developed instead by Bit Managers, it is only released in Europe. The spiritual successor to this game was Smashing Drive.

Gameplay

Radikal Bikers is set in a Mediterranean environment, and is based on delivering pizza on a rare Italian scooter called Italjet Dragster in heavy traffic before your AI opponent does, while getting points. The arcade version has three difficulty levels, which correspond to each of the different places: Margherita (easy, set in Milan), Capricciosa (medium, set in Rome), and Diabola (hard, set in Naples). If you beat all four races in a level, you get to play the next level free. Meanwhile, the PlayStation version includes four more locations on top of the original three as part of the extended Radikal mode: Marinara (set in Venice), Fantasia (set in Paris), Reggiana (set in London) and Americana (set in New York)

Points
 Win one race - +50000 (Arcade) / Up to +10000 (Radikal);
 Get Power-up - +1000 (Arcade) / +100 (Radikal) each;
 Power Kick destructions - +1000 (Arcade) / +100 (Radikal) each;
 Grabbing an Extra Point Power-up - +3000 (Arcade) / +400 (Radikal) each;
 Grabbing a bad Power-up - -100 each.

Power-ups
 Turbo - Indicated by the letter "T", which gives the High Speed, which is incompatible with Power Kick;
 Power Kick - Indicated by the "bomb", which allows you to blow up cars by kicking them in the side for points, and is also incompatible with Turbo;
 Extra Points - Indicated by "+$", which gives a bonus of 3000 points in Arcade Mode, or 400 points in Radikal Mode;
 Extra Time - Indicated by the "hourglass", which gives +1 second of time;
 The Joker - Indicated by the "?", which gives a Random power-up or extra points, which is actually based on its position and the biker you choose.

Characters
On the Arcade version are:
 Carlo - From "Paolo's Maniak Pizza";
 Gino - From "Frenzy Mario Pizza", but is present in the PlayStation version with the new name Paolo;
 Nina - From "Paolo's Maniak Pizza", but is present in the PlayStation version (under different clothes and complexion) with the name Mbelle;
 Sofia - From "Frenzy Mario Pizza", she is also present in the PlayStation version of the game.

Finally, on the PlayStation version there are three new characters: Albert, Gus and Noodles.

Development

Release

Reception 

Next Generation reviewed the arcade version of the game, rating it four stars out of five, and stated that "There's nothing else quite like this gem in the arcades, and it's sure to bring a smile to your face."

Legacy

Notes

References

External links 
 Radikal Bikers at GameFAQs
 Radikal Bikers at Killer List of Videogames
 Radikal Bikers at MobyGames

1998 video games
Arcade video games
Atari games
Cancelled Game Boy Color games
Gaelco games
Infogrames games
Multiplayer and single-player video games
PlayStation (console) games
Racing video games
SNK games
Video games about food and drink
Video games developed in Spain
Video games scored by Joan Sanmarti
Video games set in Italy